Donald Devereux Woods (16 February 1912 - 6 November 1964) was a British microbiologist.

He was born in Ipswich, the son of Walter and Violet Woods, and educated at Northgate School, Ipswich. He entered Trinity Hall, Cambridge, graduating in 1933 and gaining a PhD there in 1937.

In 1939 he joined the Medical Research Council Unit for Bacterial Chemistry, working at the Middlesex Hospital, London. After World War II, during which he had been engaged on secret work, he became reader in Microbiology at Oxford University and in 1955 accepted the new Iveagh Chair of Chemical Microbiology there.

Awards and honours
 1952 Elected a Fellow of the Royal Society His nomination reads:
1953 Marjory Stephenson Prize

References

1912 births
1964 deaths
Scientists from Ipswich
Alumni of Trinity Hall, Cambridge
British microbiologists
Fellows of the Royal Society
People educated at Northgate Grammar School, Ipswich